Enzo Alfatahi (born 9 July 2003) is a French professional footballer who plays as a left-back for Troyes II.

Career
Alfatahi made his professional debut with Troyes in a 1–0 Coupe de France loss to AJ Auxerre on 19 January 2021.

Personal life
Born in France, Alfatahi is of Moroccan descent.

References

External links
 

2003 births
French sportspeople of Moroccan descent
Living people
French footballers
Association football fullbacks
ES Troyes AC players
Championnat National 3 players